Lucăceni may refer to:

 Lucăceni, a village in Berveni Commune, Satu Mare County, Romania
 Lucăceni, a village in Horeşti Commune, Făleşti district, Moldova

See also 
 Luca (disambiguation)
 Lucăcești (disambiguation)
 Lucăcilă River (disambiguation)